Hurley W. Rudd (September 11, 1927 – August 10, 2006) was an American politician. He served as a Democratic member for the 9th and 10th district of the Florida House of Representatives.

Life and career 
Rudd served in the United States Army during the Korean War.

In 1986, Rudd was elected to represent the 10th district of the Florida House of Representatives, succeeding Herb Morgan. He served until 1992, when he was succeeded by Allen Boyd. In the same year, he was elected to represent the 9th district, succeeding Al Lawson. He served until 1994, when he was succeeded by Marjorie R. Turnbull.

Rudd died in August 2006, at the age of 78.

References 

1927 births
2006 deaths
Democratic Party members of the Florida House of Representatives
20th-century American politicians